Ghost Searchers is an American short film produced and directed by Neil George.

Plot 
A dark comedy short film that follows Matt and Jeff, two hapless local paranormal investigators in the wake of a community becoming more skeptical of the supernatural. When Robert hires them to take on a wild case, the Ghost Searchers must separate fact from fiction and help the troubled specter cross over to the other side.

Cast 
 Max Doubt as Matt
 Jonny Lee as Jeff
 Dylan Terrill as Robert
 Ashley McIntosh as Katie

Awards 
 Good Life Audience Award, 17th annual Bernal Heights Outdoor Cinema

External links

References 

2020 short films
2020s English-language films